Bergton, formerly Dovesville, is an unincorporated community located in Rockingham County, in the U.S. state of Virginia. It is located in George Washington National Forest, northwest of Timberville and adjacent to Criders near the state border with West Virginia.

History
In 1936, the village along with Cootes Store was affected by the Great Flood. The flood washed away many barns, cottages and other features in the area.
Bergton was originally known as Dovesville for the large number of Dove families in the region. A post office mandate changed the name to avoid confusion with the town of Covesville. In 1987 the Bergton Elementary School was closed due to dwindling enrollment.

References

Unincorporated communities in Rockingham County, Virginia
Unincorporated communities in Virginia